Ryan Briscoe (born 24 September 1981) is an Australian-American professional racing driver from Sydney who has predominantly raced open-wheel and sports cars in Europe and America.

In IndyCar he collected 8 wins and 28 podiums, finishing third in the 2009 season, fifth in 2008 and 2010, and sixth in 2011 and 2012. In sports car racing, he has won the 2020 24 Hours of Daytona and the 2020 Petit Le Mans, was runner-up at the 2007 American Le Mans Series LMP2 class, and won the 2013 12 Hours of Sebring LMP2 class, the 2008 and 2013 Petit Le Mans LMP2 class, the 2015 24 Hours of Daytona GTLM class, and finished third overall at the 2008 24 Hours of Daytona.

Career biography

Early career 
Like many racing drivers, he started his career in karting, first racing in 1993. After winning Australian, North American and Italian championships, he moved to Formula Renault in 2000. He won the Italian Formula Renault Championship in 2001 (winning 5 races) and finished 4th running a limited schedule in the Eurocup (with 2 wins in 6 races).

2002–04: Toyota F1 test driver 
In 2002, he became test driver for the Toyota Formula One team which made its debut that season. He started that year racing in the Formula 3000 series, but struggled and left his ride after 7 races. He finished the year in the German Formula Three Championship, taking 3 podiums in the last 6 rounds. He also won the Formula Three Euroseries in 2003 (winning 8 races in the process). He became the Toyota F1 team's 'third' driver (i.e., drove the team's test car on Fridays at Grands Prix) for the last third of the 2004 season, after previous third driver Ricardo Zonta was called up to replace Cristiano da Matta.

2005: Move to IndyCar with Ganassi
There were rumors that Briscoe was set to race for the Jordan Grand Prix F1 team in 2005, due to the team's acquisition of Toyota power. Instead, Briscoe moved to America and raced for Target Chip Ganassi Racing in the IndyCar Series, including a 10th-place finish in the Indianapolis 500. He also made his Rolex Grand-Am début with Ganassi at the 24 Hours of Daytona.

In the 2005 IndyCar Series, Briscoe took pole position at Sears Point, but struggled on the ovals and was involved in several crashes. On 11 September 2005 he was involved in a violent crash at Chicagoland Speedway, breaking both clavicles among other injuries. His car climbed on top of the Cheever Racing entry driven by Alex Barron and went airborne into the catch fencing above the retaining wall and snapping in two. He was released from hospital on 19 September and following some initial treatment in the US, moved to the specialist Formula Medicine facility in Viareggio, Italy, for the bulk of his rehabilitation. It took 8 weeks for Briscoe to recover from the injuries he sustained in the crash. His official web site announced his return to the USA on 14 November 2005.

2006–07: Limited campaigns 
Briscoe was dropped by Ganassi for 2006, replaced by 2005 IndyCar champion Dan Wheldon. During the winter, he tested with fellow Australian and Champ Car owner Kevin Kalkhoven's PKV Racing team. Briscoe also tested for the Conquest Racing team. Briscoe competed in the 2006 24 Hours of Daytona with 2005 champions Wayne Taylor, Max Angelelli and Emmanuel Collard, but the team withdrew due to accident damage before Briscoe's turn to drive.

In 2006, Briscoe was announced as an endurance driver for Holden Racing Team in the Australian V8 Supercars touring car series. He partnered Jim Richards at the Sandown 500 and Bathurst 1000, with Richards crashing the car before Briscoe could drive a race lap at Bathurst. Briscoe also drove in the A1 Grand Prix race at Laguna Seca in the US for A1 Team Australia, scoring three points.

At the Indy 500 he was a surprise late driver of the #48 car for A. J. Foyt Racing – the deal was so late he was still having his seat fitting with less than half an hour of Bump Day qualifying left, and he never got out on the track to attempt a qualifying run. He returned to the IRL the following week and drove the #5 Dreyer & Reinbold Racing Dallara to a third-place finish at Watkins Glen International, a road course. He returned to the Dreyer & Reinbold team on a three race deal for the short speedways in the second half of the season, but recorded DNF's in 2 of his 3 races with the team. He then was tabbed to replace the injured Cristiano da Matta in the final two races of the Champ Car season for the RuSPORT team, including his home country's race at Surfers Paradise.

Briscoe signed a deal to drive for Penske Racing's Porsche RS Spyder LMP2 car in the American Le Mans Series. He took three wins in a full campaign driving with Sascha Maassen. Briscoe continued to drive the RS Spyder in a limited campaign in 2008. He scored his only class victory that year at Petit Le Mans, winning with fellow IndyCar driver Hélio Castroneves.

Briscoe's ties to Penske were also strengthened in 2007 when he was named to drive in the Indy 500 in a car owned by Stephen J. Luczo and Jay Penske, with equipment leased from defending '500' champion Penske Racing. Driving the #12 Symantec Luczo-Dragon Racing machine, Briscoe qualified 7th with a four lap average speed of 224.410. In the race on 28 May 2007, he completed all 166 laps before the race was called due to inclement weather. Briscoe finished 5th amongst the 33 participants earning him $302,305 and 30 driver points.

2008–2012: IndyCar contender with Penske 

Ryan Briscoe signed to drive for Penske's IndyCar team as a full-time race driver for the 2008 IndyCar Series season, replacing Sam Hornish Jr., who started racing full-time in Penske's NASCAR team in 2008. Briscoe knocked himself out of the 2008 Indianapolis 500 along with Danica Patrick when Briscoe came out of the pits and ran into Patrick tearing up her suspension and tearing the front end of Briscoe's car. Patrick and Briscoe were fined $100,000 and placed on probation at the end of the season.

Briscoe earned his first career win at the Milwaukee Mile just one week after Indy, holding off Scott Dixon and avoiding a late crash involving Marco Andretti, Ed Carpenter, and Vítor Meira. Briscoe became the sixth driver in IndyCar history to score his first win while driving for Penske, following Mark Donohue (in 1971), Tom Sneva (1975), Rick Mears (1978), Paul Tracy (1993), and teammate Hélio Castroneves (2000). He followed up his first career win with a second victory, shortly after the halfway point of the season, at the Honda 200 on the Mid-Ohio Sports Car Course.

Briscoe also became the first Australian to claim victory at their home event, the 2008 Nikon Indy 300, on 26 October 2008, after countryman and favorite Will Power crashed out early in the race. The race, however, was not held for championship points and was the last major open-wheel event held at the Surfers Paradise Street Circuit.

2009 was Briscoe's best season in the championship, with 3 wins and 8 further podiums. Briscoe was leading the championship by 25 points before the penultimate round, the Indy Japan 300 at the Twin Ring Motegi. Briscoe then hit the wall exiting accelerating from the pit exit and had to retire, dropping to third in the championship behind Dario Franchitti and Dixon. Briscoe remained in championship contention heading into the final event at Homestead-Miami Speedway, however in a three-way battle between the title contenders, Briscoe could only finish second behind Franchitti, who became champion.

Briscoe won a single race at Texas Motor Speedway in 2010, but could not recapture the heights of 2009 and did not win another race until Sonoma Raceway in 2012. Briscoe did, however, take pole for the 2012 Indianapolis 500, becoming the first Australian to do so. Briscoe matched his best finishing position of fifth in the race.

2013–14: ALMS and return to Ganassi 
At the beginning of 2013, Briscoe was unable to secure an Indycar ride. Instead, he was hired by Level 5 Motorsports to drive an HPD ARX-03b in the P2 class of the 2013 12 Hours of Sebring. Briscoe won his class with Scott Tucker and Marino Franchitti, his first ALMS P2 class win since 2008. Later, just before the Toyota Grand Prix of Long Beach in April, Level 5 announced it had signed Briscoe on as a full-season P2 driver with Tucker, going on to win six times across the season. With the team Briscoe also made his debut in the 24 Hours of Le Mans but the entry was not classified.

Meanwhile, just before the 2013 Grand Prix of Alabama in April, Chip Ganassi Racing announced they had signed Briscoe to return to the team for the 2013 Indianapolis 500 as a 3rd entry. Following the 500, in which Briscoe finished 12th, Panther Racing announced that it had signed Briscoe to replace J. R. Hildebrand in the #4 National Guard car from Detroit onwards.

Following Dario Franchitti's retirement after a crash at the Grand Prix of Houston, Tony Kanaan moved from a planned fourth Ganassi Racing car, and Briscoe took over the fourth #8 NTT Data car from Kanaan for the 2014 IndyCar Series. He finished 11th in the points and failed to finish on the podium. He parted ways with Ganassi at the end of the season, as the No. 8 car needed more funding to continue.

Having returned to the V8 Supercars Bathurst 1000 in 2010, and competing as a mandated 'international driver' in the Gold Coast 600 between 2010 and 2012, Briscoe returned to Australia in 2013 to compete in the newly launched three-event series of two-driver races known as the Enduro Cup. The final race of this campaign, also at the Gold Coast 600, saw Briscoe take his first championship podium driving with Russell Ingall.

2015: Corvette success and IndyCar substitution

For the 2015 IndyCar Series season Briscoe had been in negotiations to race for Schmidt Peterson Motorsports, but that fell through when financial arrangements could not be made for the team to field a third car.  However, the team then called Briscoe in as replacement driver for James Hinchcliffe at the 2015 Indianapolis 500 after Hinchcliffe suffered a severe injury after qualifying for the race. He returned to the team at Texas and joined as permanent replacement driver from Fontana onwards. He collected four top-ten finishes in eight races in what were his final appearances in the championship.

Meanwhile, Briscoe continued a relationship with Corvette Racing in the GTLM category that had commenced in 2014 with selected entries as a third driver in the endurance United SportsCar Championship (IMSA) events. In 2015, Briscoe won his class at the 2015 24 Hours of Daytona and 2015 12 Hours of Sebring driving the Chevrolet Corvette C7.R with Antonio García and Jan Magnussen. The team also entered the 2015 24 Hours of Le Mans but failed to make the start after a crash in qualifying.

2016–19: Ford GT with Ganassi 
In 2016, Ford launched a return to endurance sports car racing with Chip Ganassi Racing running a Ford GT across both the FIA World Endurance (WEC) and WeatherTech SportsCar Championship (IMSA) championships. Briscoe was selected to join the IMSA team which, alongside former IndyCar rival Scott Dixon and Richard Westbrook, also made annual appearances in the WEC's 24 Hours of Le Mans. The trio scored a class podium at the 2016 24 Hours of Le Mans and Briscoe claimed his 2nd 24 Hours of Daytona class win in 2018. In the IMSA championship, Westbrook and Briscoe contested full seasons with Dixon joining them for the endurance races. Westbrook and Briscoe finished second in the championship in both 2016 and 2018. The Ford works programme shut down at the end of the 2019 season.

2020: Wayne Taylor Racing 
Briscoe switched to the Prototype class for the 2020 IMSA WeatherTech Championship, partnering with Renger van der Zande as full-time driver at Wayne Taylor Racing. The duo won the 2020 24 Hours of Daytona along with Scott Dixon and Kamui Kobayashi. In October 2020, Briscoe, van der Zande and Dixon won the 2020 Petit Le Mans at Road Atlanta.

Personal life 
In addition to his native English, Briscoe speaks Italian and French. He attended Trinity Grammar School in Summer Hill, Sydney, Australia, however he had left to compete in Europe before completing his education.

He has been married to ESPN anchor Nicole Briscoe (née Manske) since 2009 and the couple have two children. In April 2018, he became a naturalized American citizen.

Racing record

Career summary 

† As Briscoe was a guest driver, he was ineligible for points.
* Season still in progress.

Complete International Formula 3000 results
(key) (Races in bold indicate pole position) (Races in italics indicate fastest lap)

Complete Formula 3 Euro Series results
(key)

Complete Formula One results
(key) (Races in bold indicate pole position)

* Was entered as Third Driver, but did not run due to bad weather.

Complete A1 Grand Prix results
(key) (Races in bold indicate pole position) (Races in italics indicate fastest lap)

IndyCar results
(key) (Races in bold indicate pole position)

 1 Run on same day.
 2 Non-points-paying, exhibition race.
 3 The Las Vegas Indy 300 was abandoned after Dan Wheldon died from injuries sustained in a 15-car crash on lap 11. ** Podium (Non-win) indicates 2nd or 3rd place finishes.
 *** Top 10s (Non-podium) indicates 4th through 10th place finishes.

 Indianapolis 500 

Champ Car results

Rolex Sports Car Series results
(key) (Races in bold indicate pole position) (Races in italics indicate fastest lap)

American Le Mans Series results
(key) (Races in bold indicate pole position) (Races in italics indicate fastest lap)

Complete IMSA SportsCar Championship results
(key) (Races in bold indicate pole position) (Races in italics indicate fastest lap)

* Season still in progress.

24 Hours of Daytona results

Complete 12 Hours of Sebring results

Complete 24 Hours of Le Mans results

Complete FIA World Endurance Championship results
(key) (Races in bold indicate pole position) (Races in italics indicate fastest lap)

* Season still in progress.

Supercars Championship results
(key) (Races in bold indicate pole position) (Races in italics'' indicate fastest lap)

† Not Eligible for points
* Season still in progress

Complete Bathurst 1000 results

References

External links 

 Ryan Briscoe's official website
 Racing Reference – US Racing Stats
 Driver Database – Career stats
 Motorsport.com – Articles & photo's
 IndyCar Driver Page
 Photograph of Ryan's huge crash in 2005
 Photo sequence of infernal 2005 Chicagoland crash (from Paddocktalk).
 IndyCar 11 in '11 video

1981 births
Living people
Australian IndyCar Series drivers
Champ Car drivers
Indianapolis 500 drivers
International Formula 3000 drivers
A1 Team Australia drivers
British Formula Three Championship drivers
French Formula Three Championship drivers
German Formula Three Championship drivers
Italian Formula Three Championship drivers
Formula 3 Euro Series drivers
Formula 3 Euro Series champions
Italian Formula Renault 2.0 drivers
Formula Renault Eurocup drivers
24 Hours of Daytona drivers
American Le Mans Series drivers
Supercars Championship drivers
Rolex Sports Car Series drivers
Karting World Championship drivers
Australian expatriate sportspeople in Italy
Australian expatriate sportspeople in the United States
Racing drivers from Sydney
Sportsmen from New South Wales
24 Hours of Le Mans drivers
FIA World Endurance Championship drivers
WeatherTech SportsCar Championship drivers
Indianapolis 500 polesitters
IndyCar Series drivers
Prema Powerteam drivers
Nordic Racing drivers
Chip Ganassi Racing drivers
Dreyer & Reinbold Racing drivers
RuSPORT drivers
Dragon Racing drivers
Team Penske drivers
Level 5 Motorsports drivers
Panther Racing drivers
Arrow McLaren SP drivers
Corvette Racing drivers
Wayne Taylor Racing drivers
Porsche Motorsports drivers
Multimatic Motorsports drivers
A1 Grand Prix drivers
Alan Docking Racing drivers
Andretti Autosport drivers